Karl-Heinz Krüger (born 25 December 1953) is a retired boxer, who represented East Germany at the 1980 Summer Olympics in Moscow, Soviet Union. There he won the bronze medal in the welterweight division (– 67 kg), after being defeated in the semifinals by eventual gold medalist Andrés Aldama of Cuba. Two years earlier he also captured the bronze, at the second World Championships in Belgrade.

Olympic results 
Defeated Mohamed Ali El-Dahan (Syria) 5–0
Defeated Lucas Msomba (Tanzania) 5–0
Defeated Joseph Frost (Great Britain) 5–0
Lost to Andrés Aldama (Cuba) 0–5

References

1953 births
Living people
Welterweight boxers
Boxers at the 1980 Summer Olympics
Olympic boxers of East Germany
Olympic bronze medalists for East Germany
Olympic medalists in boxing
Medalists at the 1980 Summer Olympics
German male boxers
AIBA World Boxing Championships medalists
People from Templin
Sportspeople from Brandenburg